Abū Marwān ʿAbd al-Malik ibn Abī l-Qāsim ibn Muḥammad ibn al-Kardabūs al-Tawzarī  (floruit 12th–13th century) was a Tunisian historian, perhaps of Andalusian origin. He was born in Tozeur and studied the hadith and jurisprudence under Abū Ṭāhir al-Silafī at Alexandria. His best-known work is Taʾrīkh al-Andalus, a history of Muslim Spain. His Kitāb al-iktifāʾ is the earliest source to attribute the title Emperor of the Two Religions to King Alfonso VI of León. He died in Tunis.

Editions

References

13th-century Arabic writers
13th-century historians from al-Andalus
Tunisian Muslims
13th-century people of Ifriqiya
12th-century people of Ifriqiya
People from Tozeur